The Governor General's Awards in Visual and Media Arts are annual awards for achievements in visual and media arts in Canada. Up to eight awards are presented annually with the prize amount is $25,000

Created in 2000 by then Governor General Adrienne Clarkson, the awards is managed by the Canada Council for the Arts. An independent peer jury of senior visual and media arts professionals selects up to seven laureates to be recognized for artistic achievement and one award for outstanding contributions in a professional or volunteer role. Visual and media artists in fine arts (painting, drawing, photography, print-making and sculpture, including installation and other three-dimensional work), applied arts (architecture and fine crafts), independent film and video, or audio and new media are eligible for the annual award. Since 2007, the Saidye Bronfman Award for excellence in the fine crafts is also awarded by this process.

In 2015, each laureate received $25,000 and recognition in the form of an exhibition at the National Gallery of Canada.

Laureates (2000–2020)

Saidye Bronfman Award

References

External links
 

Visual
Visual
Governor General's Award in Visual and Media Arts
Governor General's Award in Visual and Media Arts
Laureates of the Governor General's Award in Visual and Media Arts
Laureates of the Governor General's Award in Visual and Media Arts
Governor General's Award in Visual and Media Arts